Sarah Smarsh (born 1980) is an American journalist and nonfiction writer.

Background 
Smarsh was born in rural Kansas and grew up on farms and in small towns.  Her family moved frequently, and she attended eight schools before she reached ninth grade.  She attended the University of Kansas starting in 1998, and received her MFA in nonfiction writing from Columbia University.

While in fifth grade, Smarsh wrote a story about her family for a class assignment. Her teacher at the time sent the story to a national children's magazine, where it was then published. After the story was published, Smarsh told her family that she would one day publish a full book about them.

She has been a fellow at the Shorenstein Center on Media, Politics and Public Policy. She has written for publications including the Columbia Journalism Review, The New York Times, The Guardian, and The New Yorker.

Published works 
Published in 2018, Heartland is an autobiographical work which focuses on the lives of her family members, white blue-collar residents of the Midwestern and Southern USA; the book was a finalist for the National Book Award and the Kirkus Prize and a 2019 recipient of the Kansas Notable Book Award. She Come By It Natural (2020) is a collection of essays about Dolly Parton, provoked by stereotyped coverage of rural people in the context of the 2016 election. The book was a finalist for the nonfiction category of the National Books Critics Circle Award.

Other works 
In 2019, Smarsh started the podcast The Homecomers. The podcast spotlights and interviews people from rural and working class communities, similar to the ones that Smarsh herself grew up in, in order to dispel stereotypes about themselves and the places where they live.

References 

1980 births
Living people
21st-century American journalists
21st-century American non-fiction writers
21st-century American women writers
University of Kansas alumni
Columbia University alumni
American essayists